IS4C or Integrated Systems for Co-ops is a free web-based point of sale software for retail stores initially developed by Tak Tang for the Wedge Community Co-op in Minneapolis, Minnesota. The software utilizes an SQL database and enables tracking of customer purchase totals that cooperatives use in calculating patronage refunds for their members. IS4C and Fannie, its backend management system were written almost exclusively in PHP. IS4C software is used primarily by food cooperatives and has been released under the GNU General Public License. Versions of IS4C have been adopted by Whole Foods Co-op, People's Food Co-op, Alberta Cooperative Grocery, River Valley Co-op, and the Clintonville Community Market Co-op in Columbus, Ohio.

References

External links
IS4C home
IS4C Project on Google Code
Co-ops making history! World's first open-source POS system at People's Food Co-op. Portland Independent Media Center.

Free software programmed in PHP